Vanags (feminine: Vanaga) is a Latvian surname, derived from the Latvian word for "hawk". Individuals with the surname include:

Aleksandrs Vanags (1919–1986), Latvian football and basketball player
Aleksandrs Vanags (architect) (1873-1919), Latvian architect
Ēriks Vanags (1892–2001), Latvian athlete
Jānis Vanags (born 1958), Latvian archbishop
Jūlijs Vanags (1903–1986), Latvian writer and translator

Latvian-language masculine surnames